Anne Valerie Aflalo (born 7 October 1976 in Malmö) is a Swedish model, beauty queen and fashion designer. Aflalo is perhaps most known for being crowned Miss Sweden 2000 and representing her country at Miss Universe 2000 in Nicosia, Cyprus. Since 2005, she has designed clothing for her own label "Valerie." Aflalo was also the host of a morning radio talkshow on NRJ.

Valerie Aflalo is the daughter of Pierre Maurice Aflalo and Ann-Christine Aflalo. She studied at Borgarskolan in Malmö during 1995.

References

External links
Valerie-Stockholm

1976 births
Living people
Miss Universe 2000 contestants
People from Malmö
Swedish beauty pageant winners
Swedish female models
Swedish radio presenters
Swedish women radio presenters
Swedish fashion designers
Swedish women fashion designers
20th-century Swedish women